Faraz is both a surname and given name of Persian origin. Notable people with the name include:

Given name:
Faraz Ahmed (born 1984), Pakistani first-class cricketer
Faraz Akram (born 1993), Zimbabwean cricketer
Faraz Ali (born 1993), Pakistani first-class cricketer
Faraz Anwar (born 1977), Pakistani Progressive metal guitarist, both solo and in the band Mizraab
Faraz Dero, Pakistani Provincial Minister of Sindh for Auqaf, Religious Affairs, and Zakat and Ushr
Faraz Emamali, Iranian football forward
Faraz Fatemi (born 1977), Iranian footballer
Faraz Fatmi, Indian politician belonging to Janata Dal (United)
Faraz Jaka (born 1985), American professional poker player and businessman
Faraz Javed, television journalist, presenter, and producer in the US and United Arab Emirates
Faraz Kamalvand (born 1976), Iranian football coach
Faraz Khan (born 1993), American professional squash player
Faraz Rabbani, scholar and researcher of Islamic law and translator from Arabic to English
Faraz Waqar (born 1976), Pakistani filmmaker, writer and film director

Surname:
Ahmed Faraz (1931–2008), Urdu poet
Mostafa Mousavi Faraz (born 1944), Iranian Twelver Shia ayatollah
Shibli Faraz, Pakistani politician, Minister of Science and Technology

See also
Shirin Faraz F.C., an Iranian football club based in Kermanshah, Iran
Faraaz